Trixomorpha is a genus of flies in the family Tachinidae.

Species
T. indica Brauer & von Bergenstamm, 1889
T. luteipennis Mesnil, 1950

References

Exoristinae
Diptera of Asia
Tachinidae genera
Taxa named by Friedrich Moritz Brauer
Taxa named by Julius von Bergenstamm